Lelio Luttazzi (27 April 1923 – 8 July 2010)  was an Italian composer, musician, actor, singer, conductor, writer, and television and radio presenter.

Born in Trieste, Luttazzi began playing the  piano at Radio Trieste and composing his first songs when he was student in law at the University of Trieste during the Second World War.  After the war, he had from SIAE a gain of 350,000 lire, a considerable sum for the time, so he decided to become a full-time composer and in 1948 he moved to Milan where he began working with fellow Teddy Reno at the record company CGD. He was among the first composers to place jazz structures in the Italian songs.

A multifaceted artist, he worked in revues and cinema as actor and composer of soundtracks; he was also a successful television and radio presenter, and probably the peak of his popularity was the radio program Hit parade, one of the longest radio programs broadcast in Italy.  In the early 1970s Luttazzi was involved together with Walter Chiari in a story of drug dealing; Luttazzi went to prison for a month before being acquitted with the formula "because the fact does not exist" but from then he basically semi-retired, leading a life reserved and returning rarely into the spotlight.

Selected filmography

References

External links
 

 

1923 births
Italian male film actors
Italian male writers
Italian television presenters
2010 deaths
Italian radio presenters
Italian composers
Italian male composers
Italian male conductors (music)
Italian jazz pianists
Italian male pianists
20th-century pianists
20th-century Italian conductors (music)
20th-century Italian male musicians
Male jazz musicians